
This is a list of aircraft in numerical order of manufacturer followed by alphabetical order beginning with 'M'.

Mw

MWZ 
(MWZ Aircraft Co, Chicago, IL)
 MWZ W-LB-50

References

Further reading

External links 

 List Of Aircraft (M)

fr:Liste des aéronefs (I-M)